The 2010 Chicago Bears season was the franchise's 91st season overall in the National Football League. Coming off a disappointing 7–9 record in the 2009 season and failing to qualify for the NFL playoffs for a third consecutive season, the Bears sought to develop their roster and improve on their record in 2010, particularly their standing in the NFC North. All Bears home games were scheduled to be played at Soldier Field. With their final regular season record at 11–5, the Bears improved drastically on their 2009 record.  Their regular season finished with their first playoff appearance since the Super Bowl season of 2006, winning the NFC North division and earning a bye as the NFC's second seed. The Bears won their first game in the Divisional round of the playoffs, defeating the Seattle Seahawks, to advance to the NFC Championship game. However, their season came to an end with a 21–14 loss to their longtime rivals and eventual Super Bowl champion Green Bay Packers.

This was the last time the Bears won the NFC North and appeared in the postseason until 2018. This was also the last year the Bears won a playoff game.

Offseason

Coaching changes
On January 5, 2010, Chicago fired offensive coordinator Ron Turner as well as position coaches Pep Hamilton (Quarterbacks), Rob Boras (Tight Ends), and Harry Hiestand (Offensive Line).  Quality Control assistants Luke Butkus and Charles London did not have their respective contracts renewed.  While it's unclear whether or not former Defensive Coordinator Bob Babich will be brought back as a Linebackers coach or released, his contract will not be extended under its current terms.

Former Minnesota Vikings head coach Mike Tice was selected to succeed Hiestand as the Bears' offensive line coach on January 15.

After nearly a month-long search for Turner's replacement, on February 1, 2010, former St. Louis Rams head coach Mike Martz was hired to the Chicago coaching staff as Offensive Coordinator.

Following the Martz hire, Mike DeBord, former college head coach and Seattle Seahawks position coach, as a tight ends coach.

With the addition of Martz and DeBord in the offseason, the amount of experience on the staff grew. These two offseason acquisitions joined defensive line coach (and former Detroit Lions head coach), Rod Marinelli.

In a series of moves finalizing their 2010 coaching roster, the Bears hired former San Francisco 49ers quarterbacks coach Shane Day (an assistant to Mike Martz during his tenure in San Francisco) and quality control coaches Andrew Hayes-Stoker and Mikal Smith, assigned to the offense and defense, respectively.  Defensive line coach Rod Marinelli was promoted to Defensive Coordinator and his assistant, Eric Washington, was promoted to the vacated position.

On April 27, 2010, the Bears allowed the contract of Director of College Scouting, Greg Gabriel, a member of the Bears scouting staff since 2001, to expire.  There has been no announcement regarding who will succeed him.

In a long anticipated move, on April 30, the Bears welcomed former Seattle Seahawks officer Tim Ruskell to assume the post of Director of Pro Personnel at Halas Hall.

2010 NFL Draft

Draft pick trades
 In 2009, Chicago traded their second round pick to the Tampa Bay Buccaneers for Gaines Adams.
 In 2009, the Bears traded their 2010 first round pick (along with 2009 NFL Draft selections and quarterback Kyle Orton) to the Denver Broncos for quarterback Jay Cutler.

2010 Chicago Bears draft choices

Training Camp

The Bears announced in April that the first Training Camp session will be held on July 30, 2010 at Olivet Nazarene University in Bourbonnais.  This is preceded by the official Rookie Mini-Camp which traditionally is held the weekend following the NFL Draft at Halas Hall, this year beginning on April 30.

Rookie Mini-Camp
A total of 54 players were listed on the roster sheet for the Chicago Bears' April 30 – May 3 Rookie Mini-Camp at Halas Hall.  In addition to the five drafted rookies and the 13 rookie signees, the Bears invited 31 undrafted free agents to participate on a try-out basis.

Summary of offseason roster changes

Final roster

Staff

Schedule

Preseason
The Bears preseason schedule was announced on March 31, 2010.

Regular season

Standings

Regular season

Week 1: vs. Detroit Lions

The Bears kicked off their season at home with an NFC North duel against the Detroit Lions. In the first quarter, the Bears took the early lead with kicker Robbie Gould nailing a 20-yard field goal. The Lions responded with 2 TD runs (7 and 4 yards) by running back Jahvid Best in the second quarter. The Bears fought back with quarterback Jay Cutler completing an 89-yard screen pass to running back Matt Forté for a TD, followed by Gould's 31-yard field goal after a Stafford fumble. The Bears increased their lead in the fourth quarter when Cutler threw a 28-yard TD pass to Matt Forté. The Bears tried to extend their lead to 7, but failed on their 2-point conversion. The game ended in somewhat controversial fashion, however, as an apparent touchdown reception in the final minute by Detroit receiver Calvin Johnson was overturned via a little known rule (completing the process of a catch) and ruled incomplete.

With the win, Chicago began the season at 1–0.

Week 2: at Dallas Cowboys

Hoping to continue their winning streak, the Bears flew to Cowboys Stadium for an NFC matchup with the Cowboys. In the first quarter Chicago took the early lead as kicker Robbie Gould nailed a 38-yard field goal. Then they trailed with WR Dez Bryant returning a punt 62 yards to the endzone for a touchdown. While the Cowboys were able to pressure quarterback Jay Cutler in the early stages of the game, the Bears' offense made adjustments and regained momentum.  The Bears got the lead back when Cutler made a 39-yard TD pass to tight end Greg Olsen. In the second quarter the Bears trailed again when QB Tony Romo made a 1-yard touchdown pass to RB Chris Gronkowski, but took the lead with Cutler making a nine-yard TD pass to WR Devin Hester. The Bears increased their lead when kicker Robbie Gould made a 40-yard field goal. In the third quarter Dallas would reply with kicker David Buehler nailing a 28-yard field goal. The Bears increased their lead in the fourth quarter when Cutler made a three-yard TD pass to RB Matt Forte. The Cowboys made the final score of the game with Buehler hitting a 48-yard field goal.

With the win, Chicago improved to 2–0.

Week 3: vs. Green Bay Packers

Coming off their road win over the Cowboys, the Bears went home, donned their throwback uniforms, and played a Week 3 Monday night duel with their so-called hated rival, the Green Bay Packers.  Chicago would trail in the first quarter as Packers quarterback Aaron Rodgers completed a seven-yard touchdown pass to wide receiver Greg Jennings.  Green Bay would add onto their lead in the second quarter with a 38-yard field goal from kicker Mason Crosby.  Afterwards, the Bears answered with quarterback Jay Cutler connecting with tight end Greg Olsen on a nine-yard touchdown pass. After a scoreless third quarter, Chicago took the lead as wide receiver Devin Hester returned a punt 62 yards for a touchdown. However, the Packers struck back as Rodgers got a three-yard touchdown run. The Bears would get the last laugh as kicker Robbie Gould booted 25-yard and 19-yard field goals, the latter in the closing seconds of the game to put the Bears on top.

With the win, Chicago improved to 3–0.

Week 4: at New York Giants

Coming off their Monday night home win over the Packers, the Bears flew to New Meadowlands Stadium for a Week 4 Sunday night duel with the New York Giants.  Chicago would trail early in the first quarter as Giants kicker Lawrence Tynes got a 22-yard field goal.  Both teams went scoreless in the second quarter, but pressure on Bears quarterback Jay Cutler was mounting.  By the half's end, Cutler had already been sacked nine times.  Cutler would leave the game early in the third quarter with a concussion and would be replaced by backup Todd Collins. The Bears' deficit increased in the third quarter as running back Ahmad Bradshaw got a three-yard touchdown run.  Chicago would finally get on the board in the fourth quarter as kicker Robbie Gould got a 40-yard field goal, but New York would come right back as running back Brandon Jacobs scored on a two-yard touchdown run.

With the loss, Chicago fell to 3–1.

Week 5: at Carolina Panthers

Hoping to rebound from their loss to the Giants the Bears flew to Bank of America Stadium for a matchup against the Carolina Panthers.  The Bears took the lead in the first quarter as RB Matt Forte got an 18-yard TD run. The Panthers replied with kicker John Kasay making a 24-yard field goal. The lead increased with Forte making a 68-yard TD run, followed by a 28-yard field goal from kicker Robbie Gould. In the third quarter the Panthers replied with Kasay making a 53-yard field goal, but in the fourth quarter the Bears pulled away when Gould made 53- and 43-yard field goals.

With the win, Chicago improved to 4–1.

Week 6: vs. Seattle Seahawks

Hoping to increase their winning streak the Bears returned to Chicago for an NFC duel with the Seattle Seahawks. The Bears took the early lead as RB Matt Forte got a six-yard TD run. But the Seahawks answered back with QB Matt Hasselbeck getting a 22-yard TD pass to WR Deon Butler, followed in the second quarter by RB Justin Forsett getting a 9-yard TD run. Then the Bears responded with kicker Robbie Gould making a 34 and a 24-yard field goal. In the third quarter the Bears fell further behind when QB Jay Cutler was sacked in the endzone by free safety Jordan Babineaux for a safety. This was followed in the fourth quarter by RB Marshawn Lynch getting a 1-yard TD run. The Bears tried to come back into the game but only came away with a touchdown after WR Devin Hester returned a punt 89 yards to the endzone for a touchdown.

With the loss, Chicago fell to 4–2.

Week 7: vs. Washington Redskins

The Bears' seventh game was an NFC duel with the Redskins at home. In the first quarter, the Bears took a sudden lead as CB D.J. Moore returned an interception 54 yards for a touchdown. However, their defense was broken down as QB Donovan McNabb completed a 24-yard TD pass to WR Santana Moss. In the second quarter, they trailed after kicker Graham Gano nailed a 46-yard field goal. The Bears' offense broke through as QB Jay Cutler got a 9-yard TD pass to WR Johnny Knox, but was closed off in the third quarter as Cutler's pass was intercepted by DeAngelo Hall and returned 92 yards for a touchdown.

With the loss, Chicago fell to 4–3 heading into their bye week.

Week 9: at Buffalo Bills (Bills International Series)

Coming off their bye week, the Bears flew to the Rogers Centre for their Week 9 interconference duel with the winless Buffalo Bills.  After a scoreless first quarter, Chicago delivered the opening strike in the second quarter as quarterback Jay Cutler found tight end Greg Olsen on a 4-yard touchdown pass.  The Bills responded with quarterback Ryan Fitzpatrick completing a 14-yard touchdown pass to wide receiver Roscoe Parrish.

The Bears regained the lead in the third quarter with a 1-yard touchdown run from running back Chester Taylor.  Buffalo answered with running back Fred Jackson getting a 4-yard touchdown run (with a blocked extra point).  Chicago trailed in the fourth quarter as fullback Corey McIntyre got a 1-yard touchdown run, yet they came right back as Cutler found wide receiver Earl Bennett on a 2-yard touchdown pass, followed by a successful two-point conversion pass to running back Matt Forté. The Bears would eventually take the win as a Fitzpatrick throw was intercepted by cornerback Tim Jennings.

With the win, Chicago improved to 5–3.

Week 10: vs. Minnesota Vikings

Coming off their win over the Bills the Bears played on home ground for an NFC North rivalry match against the Vikings. In the first quarter the Bears trailed early after kicker Ryan Longwell hit a 36-yard field goal. They took the lead in the second quarter when QB Jay Cutler threw a 17-yard TD pass to TE Greg Olsen. They fell behind after QB Brett Favre completed a 53-yard TD pass to WR Percy Harvin. They got the lead back when Cutler got a 19-yard TD pass to WR Devin Hester. The Bears extended their lead in the third quarter after kicker Robbie Gould nailed a 34-yard field goal. The Vikings replied with Longwell making a 33-yard field goal, but the Bears continued to score with Gould hitting a 37-yard field goal, and in the 4th quarter with Cutler making a 19-yard TD pass to TE Kellen Davis.

With the win, the Bears improved to 6–3.

Week 11: at Miami Dolphins

Coming off their home win over the Vikings, the Bears flew to Sun Life Stadium for a Week 11 interconference duel with the Miami Dolphins on Thursday night.  Chicago delivered the game's opening strike in the first quarter with a 46-yard field goal from kicker Robbie Gould.  The Bears added onto their lead in the second quarter with Gould's 24-yard field goal.

Chicago went back to work in the third quarter as Gould booted a 50-yard field goal, followed by a 2-yard touchdown run from running back Matt Forté.  As they had done all game, the Bears defense continued to stifle any offensive production by the Dolphins, thus completing the shutout, the first shutout recorded by the Bears since 2006. As of 2016, this remains the final shutout by the team.

With the win, not only did the Bears improve to 7–3, but they also won their 700th game in franchise history (the first NFL team to do so).

Ironically, 25 years prior, the Bears lost to the Dolphins, with the score of the 2010 matchup being the record the 1985 team was vying for had they been able to defeat the Dolphins.

Week 12: vs. Philadelphia Eagles

Coming off their win over the Dolphins, the Bears played on home ground for an NFC duel with the Eagles. The Bears trailed early with kicker David Akers nailing a 45-yard field goal. They took the lead after QB Jay Cutler completed a 10 and a 20-yard TD pass to wide receivers Earl Bennett and Johnny Knox respectively. The lead was narrowed with QB Michael Vick getting an 8-yard TD pass to WR Jeremy Maclin, followed by Akers hitting a 36-yard field goal. The Bears increased their lead as Cutler got a 6 and a 9-yard TD pass to Bennett and Greg Olsen. This was followed by kicker Robbie Gould making a 23-yard field goal. The Eagles tried to narrow the lead as Akers got a 22 and a 36-yard field goal, followed by Vick throwing a 30-yard TD pass to TE Brent Celek, but they failed to recover the onside kick which could have given them one last shot to win.

With the win, Chicago improved to 8–3.

Week 13: at Detroit Lions

The Bears' twelfth game was an NFC North rivalry match against the Lions at Ford Field. In the first quarter the Bears trailed early as QB Drew Stanton scrambled 3 yards to the endzone for a touchdown. They replied with RB Chester Taylor getting a 1-yard TD run. The tie did not last long as kicker Dave Rayner hit a 50-yard field goal. They took the lead with RB Matt Forte getting a 14-yard TD run. They fell behind again after Stanton completed a 46-yard TD pass to WR Calvin Johnson, followed by Rayner nailing a 25-yard field goal. The Bears responded to take the win with kicker Robbie Gould making a 54-yard field goal, followed by QB Jay Cutler making a 7-yard TD pass to TE Brandon Manumaleuna.

With the win, Chicago improved to 9–3.

Week 14: vs. New England Patriots

Hoping to make it 6-straight the Bears played an interconference duel with the Patriots at home. The Bears trailed early as the Patriots commanded the first half with QB Tom Brady throwing a 7-yard TD pass to TE Rob Gronkowski, followed by RB Danny Woodhead getting a 3-yard TD run, then with ILB Gary Guyton recovering a fumble 35 yards for a touchdown. This was followed by kicker Shayne Graham getting a 30 and a 25-yard field goal, and then by Brady completing a 59-yard TD pass to WR Deion Branch. The Bears fell further behind with Graham getting a 29-yard field goal. The Bears tried to come back, but only came away with a 1-yard TD run by Chester Taylor, with the fourth quarter controlled by the defense, giving them a loss.

With the loss, Chicago fell to 9–4.

Week 15: at Minnesota Vikings

With the Monday night game having been moved to the University of Minnesota's TCF Bank Stadium due to the snow-induced collapse of the Metrodome roof, Chicago looked to rebound from the previous week's rout in the first outdoor NFL game held in Minnesota in over two decades.  Quarterback Brett Favre made a surprise start for the Vikings after having been ruled out earlier in the week due to injury.

Minnesota started strong with an impressive opening drive that culminated in a touchdown pass from Favre to Percy Harvin, but the Bears soon took control in all three phases as the Vikings would be outscored 40–7 over the rest of the game. Jay Cutler connected with Johnny Knox, Devin Hester, and Rashied Davis for three touchdown passes, and Robbie Gould was 4-for-4 on field goal attempts.  Chicago wide receiver/kick returner Devin Hester ran his way into the record books in the third quarter, scoring a touchdown on a punt return off the foot of the Vikings' Chris Kluwe and becoming the all-time NFL leader in combined punt and kick returns for touchdowns. Minnesota quarterback Joe Webb (who entered the game in the second quarter after Favre was injured while being sacked by Bears rookie Corey Wootton) scrambled for a touchdown in the third quarter.

With the win, Chicago improved to 10–4 and clinched the NFC North division title.

Week 16: vs. New York Jets

Coming off their win over the Vikings the Bears played on home ground for an interconference duel with the Jets. In the first quarter the Bears took the lead as kicker Robbie Gould got a 37-yard field goal, followed by Matt Forte getting a 22-yard TD run. They trailed with RB Shonn Greene getting a 3-yard TD run, followed by CB Dwight Lowery returning an interception 20 yards for a touchdown, followed by RB LaDainian Tomlinson getting a 3-yard TD run letting the Jets lead 21–10. The Bears tried to cut the lead as QB Jay Cutler scrambled 2 yards for a touchdown, but the lead was soon extended as kicker Nick Folk made a 26-yard field goal. They got the lead back with Cutler completing a 40 and a 25-yard TD pass to wide receivers Devin Hester and Johnny Knox respectively, but soon the game was tied with QB Mark Sanchez throwing a 23-yard TD pass to WR Santonio Holmes. The Bears escaped the tie with Cutler finding Knox again on a 26-yard TD pass. After a 34-yard field goal from Folk, and the Bears punting, the Jets attempted to score with less than a minute left in the game, but a Chris Harris interception would seal the game for the Bears.

With the win, Chicago improved to 11–4, and clinched a first-round bye when the Eagles lost to the Vikings.

Week 17: at Green Bay Packers

The Bears' final game was an NFC North rivalry rematch against the Packers. While the Bears scored first with kicker Robbie Gould nailing a 30-yard field goal, the Packers tied the game with kicker Mason Crosby hitting a 23-yard field goal, and then eventually found the winning score with QB Aaron Rodgers throwing a 1-yard TD pass to TE Donald Lee.

With the loss, the Bears finished with an 11–5 regular season record.

Postseason schedule

Postseason results

Divisional round vs. Seattle Seahawks

Entering the postseason as the NFC's #2 seed, the Bears began their playoff run at home against the #4 Seattle Seahawks, hoping to avenge their Week 6 loss.  Chicago delivered the game early strike in the first quarter as quarterback Jay Cutler found tight end Greg Olsen on a 58-yard touchdown pass, followed by a 1-yard touchdown run from running back Chester Taylor. The Bears added onto their lead in the second quarter with a 6-yard touchdown run from Cutler.

Chicago continued their dominating day in the third quarter with a 9-yard touchdown run from Cutler.  Seattle would finally get on the board as kicker Olindo Mare got a 30-yard field goal.  The Seahawks tried to rally as quarterback Matt Hasselbeck completed a 38-yard touchdown pass to wide receiver Mike Williams, yet the Bears pulled away with Cutler hooking up with tight end Kellen Davis on a 39-yard touchdown pass. Seattle closed out the game with Hasselbeck completing a 3-yard touchdown pass to Williams, followed by a 9-yard touchdown pass to wide receiver Brandon Stokley.

With the win, Chicago improved their overall record to 12–5.

NFC Championship vs. Green Bay Packers

Coming off their win over the Seahawks, the Bears stayed at home for the NFC Championship Game against their historic rival, the #6 Green Bay Packers (who were coming off their victory over the top-seeded Atlanta Falcons), in Round 3 of their 2010 series.  This would be the second playoff meeting between the two teams, the first since defeating Green Bay 33–14 in 1941.

Chicago trailed early in the first quarter as Packers quarterback Aaron Rodgers got a 1-yard touchdown run.  Green Bay added onto their lead in the second quarter as running back James Starks got a 4-yard touchdown run.  Bears center Olin Kreutz had a Lisfranc injury on the first play of the second half, but he played through the entire second half, even though he couldn't block anyone, because no one else on the active roster could effectively play center. Starting Bears quarterback Jay Cutler left the game early in the third quarter with a knee injury. After a scoreless third quarter, Chicago finally got on the board in the fourth quarter with a 1-yard touchdown run from running back Chester Taylor.  However, the Packers came right back with nose tackle B. J. Raji returning an interception 18 yards for a touchdown.  The Bears tried to rally with quarterback Caleb Hanie finding wide receiver Earl Bennett on a 35-yard touchdown pass, but Green Bay's Sam Shields intercepted a pass with 37 seconds left in the game.

With the loss, Chicago's season came to an end with an overall record of 12–6.

References

Chicago Bears seasons
NFC North championship seasons
Chicago Bears
Bear
2010 in Illinois
2010s in Chicago